Georgiyevka is a rural locality (a selo) and the administrative center of Georgiyevsky Selsoviet of Loktevsky District, Altai Krai, Russia. The population was 532 as of 2016. There are 14 streets.

Geography 
Georgiyevka is located 22 km north of Gornyak (the district's administrative centre) by road. Ustyanka is the nearest rural locality.

References 

Rural localities in Loktevsky District